Antroli is a mid-size village in Kheda district in central Gujarat with a population of approximately 15,000.

Antroli is a village in Kapadwanj Taluka, Kheda district in Central Gujarat. Its current population is about 8500 people. The primary occupation is farming & Cattle breeding.

The population consists of Patels, Thakors, Brahmins, Muslims, Harijans, Madaris etc.

There are about 100 families of snake charmers community, who mainly live a gypsy life, but have been allocated land in gochar land of the village now called Madaripura, to build houses and settle down.

It has a school named N.M.Patel high school, after a master who has generously donated and has classes up to twelfth grade in conjunction with a primary school with first to seventh grades.

There is a co-operative milk collection centre, providing infrastructure to the village population to eke out a living, supplementing their income along with the farming activity. The dairy supplies milk to Amul dairy in Anand.

About 100 families mainly from the Patel community have migrated to foreign countries for a better life, led by Arvindbhai N Patel in 1965.

More than 200 families have migrated to other parts of Gujarat and India for better education, opportunities and living standards.

The migration started around 1940's,led by Janab Jhaver Ali Sayed who established a bidi making unit in Gondia of Maharastra State, followed by Sri Vijaykumar Vaheribhai Manilal Patel, who after obtaining a engineers diploma migrated to Goa in 1963, post liberation by the Portuguese.

The Village has been continually been blessed by the Grace of Holy men, i.e. Sri Sahajanand Swami, Sri Shivanand Swami, Jagadguru Sri Shankaracharyaji and lately in the year 1985 by Sri Dattatreya Bhaskar Bhagwat[Dadaji]of Sri Sai Adhyatmik Samiti of Pune, Maharastra.

The Village has Sri Ramji Temple, Ranchodraiji Temple, Neelkantheswar Mahadev Temple, Jain Derasar, Shivashram, Bhatiji Temple, Vaherai Mata Temple, Baliya babji Temple, Meladi Mata Temple, Masjid, Church, and Shirdi Sai Baba prayer hall.

Recently Antroli reconstructed Swaminarayan [Gents] [ladies] Temple, Ramji Temple and Shivashram. The Jain Derasar is being reconstructed at an estimated cost of about Rs four crores.

Recently the Antroli leuva patidar samaj under the auspices of Charotar Moti Sattavis leuva patidar samaj has conducted Samuh [mass] marriage, wherein 19 couples have tied the nuptial knots.

The social activity was generously funded by the Patel community of Antroli.

Antroli in the past was famous for groundnut, sweet potato carrot and radish cultivation. Now the main crops grown are Tobacco, Sweet potato, Castor seeds, Wheat, millet, cotton, vegetables and Nilgiri [eucalyptus]

References

Villages in Kheda district